Kim Caraher was an Australian author. She was born in Belfast, Northern Ireland, moved to Africa at age seven, and lived in three countries before settling in the Northern Territory, Australia. She died on 19 May 2007 after suffering from cancer for a long time. After Caraher died her son posted a blog of her death, along with blogs that she had written.

In 1998, she earned a Children's Book Council Notable Book award for The Cockroach Cup, which was also shortlisted for the 2000 West Australian Young Readers' Book Award. Also her book Zip Zap earned an Aurealis Award for Best Children's Short Fiction in 2002.

Books
 There's a Bat on the Balcony (1994)
 My Teacher Turns Into a Tyrannosaurus (1996)
 Up A Gum Tree (1997)
 Yucky Poo (1998)
 The Cockroach Cup (1998)
 Goanna Anna (1999)
 Kakadu Nightmare (2001)
 Zip Zap (2001)
 Clinging To The Edge (2003)
 Mark Of The Beast (2004)

References

External links
 Kim Caraher's Homepage

Year of birth missing
2007 deaths
20th-century Australian women writers
20th-century Australian writers
21st-century Australian women writers
21st-century Australian writers
Australian children's writers
Australian women children's writers
Writers from Belfast
Writers from the Northern Territory